Getting Away with Murder is an American television and web series, which airs on the IFC in the United States.

Seth Silver, a 25-year-old hit man, is trying to make it in the world as a successful, well-adjusted adult.  While he is confident with his job, he struggles to lead a normal life, which is complicated by the fact he still lives with his mother (who thinks he's a veterinarian technician), and he even has a hard time asking a girl on a date.

The show is produced and filmed in California by Test Pattern LLC.

Characters

Cast

Episodes

Season 1 (2008-2009)

References

External links
Getting Away with Murder IFC Site
IMDB Page
Test Pattern Website

American comedy web series
IFC (American TV channel) original programming